Gov. Thomas B. Jeter House, also known as Sarratt House, is a historic home located at Union, Union County, South Carolina.  It was built in 1859, and is a two-story, clapboard dwelling with Victorian detailing.  It features a one-story front verandah and scalloped trim. It was the home of Thomas Bothwell Jeter, who served as the 79th Governor of South Carolina from September 1, 1880, to November 30, 1880.

It was added to the National Register of Historic Places in 1974.

References

Houses on the National Register of Historic Places in South Carolina
Houses completed in 1859
Houses in Union County, South Carolina
National Register of Historic Places in Union County, South Carolina